Up For Grabs is a 2002 play by Australian playwright David Williamson.

Madonna starred in the play's London West End theatre version, billed as 'Madonna Ritchie.' She received overall poor critical reviews.

Background 

Williamson's play is about the booming international art market from 1990 to the present. Total art sales at auction in Australia were less than $17 million in 1990, $27 million in 1995, $70 million in 1999, and more than $90 million in 2002. According to investment analysts, art has been the fourth best-performing asset in Australia for the ten years to 2002. This pushed contemporary Australian art prices to new highs, with Brett Whiteley's "The Jacaranda Tree" fetching $1.9 million in 1999.

The boom was fueled by the Dot com boom years, and Williamson also addresses six of the seven deadly sins (Pride, Lust, Avarice (Greed), Envy, Wrath, Gluttony), to address the "anything goes" personal and sexual excesses of the time. It is a play of bad manners, an analysis of how wealth and power can corrupt the arts.

The Plot 

The story deals with the efforts of Simone, a young fledgling art dealer, to sell a painting by Australian artist Brett Whitely for a record $2 million and thereby establish herself at the “big end of town.” This ambition turns to desperation when she signs a contract guaranteeing this price, putting both her own and her partner Gerry's assets on the line.

Simone, who has a small list of clients with the sort of money needed for this kind of transaction, sets up an unofficial auction to push up the price. Her prospective buyers include Dawn Grey, a corporate art buyer still frustrated that she did not have what it takes to be a great artist; Kel and Mindy, a young dotcom couple with more money than sense; and Manny and Felicity, a wealthy but unhappy couple looking for a suitable trophy.

The game of playing each against all becomes increasingly sticky for the inexperienced Simone, who ends up compromising herself sexually on more than one occasion: “You are a hooker aren't you? You're trying to sell me something for more than it's worth and you'll do anything to get your price,” says Manny. Simone pretends to be an honest art dealer, but then she gives in to her clients' whims in the hopes that this will seal the deal.

When the moment calls for honesty, Simone decides to warn the naïve Mindy, who has genuinely fallen in love with the art dealer, that the Whitely is grossly over-priced. Simone advises her not to put in a bid, but Manny has decided to pull out of the bidding, leaving her dangling dangerously close to bankruptcy.

In the end, Simone gets her price from the corporate art buyer, Dawn Grey, who is happy to see her clients pay $2 million as a kind of vengeful act against the corporate world. While Simone does not lose a cent, she does not make anything either. She tells the audience that the lessons learned are priceless and economic success is guaranteed because the sale will bring other paintings and clients her way. She has made it to the “big end of town.”

Versions 

 2001 Australian production, including review
 2002 London West End theatre production starring Madonna, who made her West End debut in the production. Relocated from Sydney to New York City with the object of desire a Jackson Pollock and a Brett Whiteley. A critic's comment was to use in his review a line from the play: "If you think a big marketing budget will sell any old junk, you'd be wrong. It's got to be quality junk."
2016 Australian production in Hobart, staged at the Playhouse Theatre by Hobart Repertory Theatre Society.

West End version 

Staged at Wyndhams Theatre in London, with front stall tickets costing £37.50, the final performance commenced on Saturday 13 July 2002 starting at 8.00 pm. The play lasted on stage for 2 hours and 15 minutes and included one approximately 15-minute intermission. The program, originally bought for £3, has now become a very collectible item.

Cast in order of appearance

 Loren: Madonna
 Gerry: Tom Irwin
 Mindy: Megan Dodds
 Kel: Danny Pino
 Dawn: Sian Thomas
 Manny: Michael Lerner
 Phyllis: Debora Weston
 Direction Laurence Boswell
David Williamson later reflected on the experience:
I was there for the first week of rehearsals in London when Madonna was playing the lead role... It was fascinating to see how she operated. She was very aware of her power and exercised it and demanded rewrites that she assumed would suit her character. I either did them or the play didn’t go on. I think the Australian version of the play was probably better.

Reception
The play did well in terms of sales, while critics had mixed things to say about Madonna and fans were happy with her.

References

Book sources

External links 
 Guardian review of the version with Madonna in the cast

 Plays by David Williamson
2000 plays